Fürst von der Leyen und zu Hohengeroldseck was a German noble title of the House of Leyen.

Freiherr (Baron) von der Leyen und zu Hohengeroldseck

 1692 – 17 July 1704: Johann Nikolaus (1633 – 1704)
 1705 – 22 November 1711: Karl Kaspar Franz (1655 – 1739)

Reichsgraf (Count) von der Leyen und zu Hohengeroldseck

 22 November 1711 – 20 November 1739: Karl Kaspar Franz (above)
 20 November 1739 – 16 February 1760: Friedrich Ferdinand Franz Anton (1709 – 1760)
 16 February 1760 – 26 September 1775: Franz Georg Karl Anton (1736 – 1775)
 26 September 1775 – 12 July 1806: Philipp Franz Wilhelm Ignaz Peter (1766 – 1829)

Fürst (Prince) von der Leyen und zu Hohengeroldseck

 12 July 1806 – 23 November 1829: Philipp Franz Wilhelm Ignaz Peter (above)
 23 November 1829 – 17 May 1879: Karl Eugen Damian Erwein (1798 – 1879)
 17 May 1879 – 24 July 1882: Philipp Franz Erwein Theodor (1819 – 1882)
 24 July 1882 – 18 September 1938: Erwein Theodor Philipp Damian (1863 – 1938)
 18 September 1938 – 13 February 1970: Erwein Otto Philipp Leopold Franz Joseph Ignatius (1894 – 1970)
 13 February 1970 – 9 September 1971: Ferdinand Maria Erwein Harthard Antonius Michael Joseph (1898 – 1971)
 9 September 1971: Philipp Erwein Konrad Alfred Eugen Bonifatius Melchior Georg Arbogast Frhr von Freyberg-Eisenberg (1969)
 22 November 1990: Wolfram, Hereditary Prince of Leyen and zu Hohengeroldseck (b.1990)

See also
 House of Leyen
 Principality of Leyen
 Hohengeroldseck

References

German princesses
House of Leyen
Barons of Germany
Counts of Germany